Emil Burri (1902–1966) was a German playwright and screenwriter who worked on around fifty films during his career, a prominent figure in both Nazi era and post-war German cinema. He also directed the 1942 film Beloved World, his only directorial credit. In 1955 he wrote the screenplay for the Austrian historical heimatfilm Dunja.

In the theatre he was known as a collaborator with Bertolt Brecht.

Selected filmography

Screenwriter
 Inge and the Millions (1933)
 The Island (1934)
 The Green Domino (1935)
The Green Domino (1935)
 The Royal Waltz (1935)
 Königswalzer (1935)
 Boccaccio (1936)
 A Wedding Dream (1936)
 Diamonds (1937)
 Faded Melody (1938)
 The Governor (1939)
 A Woman Like You (1939)
 Water for Canitoga (1939)
 Enemies (1940)
 What Does Brigitte Want? (1941)
 Tonelli (1943)
 Orient Express (1944)
 The Blue Straw Hat (1949)
 Chased by the Devil (1950)
 Royal Children (1950)
 Diary of a Married Woman (1953)
 Walking Back into the Past (1954)
 The Witch (1954)
 Dunja (1955)
 The Royal Waltz (1955)
 Escape from Sahara (1958)
 Stefanie (1958)
 Marili (1959)

Director
 Beloved World (1942)

References

Bibliography
 Fritsche, Maria. Homemade Men In Postwar Austrian Cinema: Nationhood, Genre and Masculinity . Berghahn Books, 2013.

External links
 

1902 births
1966 deaths
German male screenwriters
Film people from Munich
German male writers
20th-century German screenwriters